Eiffeliidae is an extinct family of sponges.

Genera
The following genera are placed in the family:
 †Astraeoconus Rietschel, 1968
 †Chilcaia Carrera, 1994
 †Eiffelia Walcott, 1920 (synonyms: Lenastella Missarzhevsky in Missarzhevsky & Mambetov, 1981; Actinoites Duan, 1984; Niphadus Duan, 1984)
 †Eiffelospongia Rigby & Collins, 2004
 †Gondekia Rigby, 1991
 †Petaloptyon Raymond, 1931 (synonyms: Canistrumella Rigby, 1986)
 †Toquimiella Rigby, 1967
 †Zangerlispongia Rigby & Nitecki, 1975

References

Prehistoric sponge families